Frederick Albert Baring (15 December 1890 – 10 December 1961) was an Australian rules footballer who played with Essendon in the Victorian Football League (VFL) during the early 1900s. In 1997 he was named at fullback in Essendon's official Team of the Century. He also played first-class cricket for Victoria.

Family 
The son of Frederick John Baring (1857–1917), and Annie Baring (−1935), née Riley, Frederick Albert Baring was born in North Melbourne (then known as "East Hotham") on 15 December 1890.

He married Minnie Sybil Horne (−1940) in 1916, and Edith Lillian Ackary in February 1944.

Football 
A four-times premiership player with Essendon (1911, 1912, 1923, 1924), Baring started his career as a ruckman and ended it as a fullback.

He kicked the winning goal in the 1912 Grand Final and captained Essendon for eight matches in the 1918 VFL season.

In 1913 he won the Essendon Best and Fairest award. He was a VFL interstate representative at the 1911 Adelaide Carnival. During his career Baring played under the pseudonym "Adamson", when he was unable to get approved leave to play in the VFL from his employer.

Cricket 
Baring was also a successful cricketer and played Sheffield Shield matches for Victoria. A right-handed batsman, he managed a total of 30 first-class matches between 1911–12 and 1928–29, scoring 1846 runs at 32.96.

Following the death of Victor Trumper, Baring was recognised as the best batsman in Australia on poor pitches. He made his highest score of 131 opening the batting for Victoria against New South Wales in December 1918.

He came close to playing Test cricket for Australia after being named in their squad to tour South Africa in 1914–15, but the series was canceled due to World War I.

Death
Baring died in the Melbourne suburb of Doncaster on 10 December 1961.

Champions of Essendon 
In 2002 an Essendon panel ranked Baring at 24 in their Champions of Essendon list of the 25 greatest players ever to have played for Essendon.

See also
 List of Victoria first-class cricketers

Footnotes

References
 Atkinson, G. (1982) Everything you ever wanted to know about Australian rules football but couldn't be bothered asking, The Five Mile Press: Melbourne. .
 Maplestone, M., Flying Higher: History of the Essendon Football Club 1872–1996, Essendon Football Club, (Melbourne), 1996. 
 Ross, J. (ed), 100 Years of Australian Football 1897–1996: The Complete Story of the AFL, All the Big Stories, All the Great Pictures, All the Champions, Every AFL Season Reported, Viking, (Ringwood), 1996.

External links

 Fred Baring, at Boules Football Photos.
Cricinfo profile

1890 births
1961 deaths
Essendon Football Club players
Essendon Football Club Premiership players
Champions of Essendon
Crichton Medal winners
Australian cricketers
Victoria cricketers
Cricketers from Melbourne
Australian rules footballers from Melbourne
Four-time VFL/AFL Premiership players
People from North Melbourne